Wellman may refer to:

Wellman (film), a 2003 Croatian documentary film about a well excavator
Wellman House, a historic site in Friendship, New York

Cities and communities
Wellman, Iowa, a city in Washington County, Iowa, near Iowa City
Wellman, Ohio, an unincorporated community in Warren County
Wellman, Texas, a city in Terry County

Other uses
Wellman (surname)

See also
Wellmann